Pethidinic acid (meperidinic acid, pethidine intermediate C) is a 4-phenylpiperidine derivative that is both a metabolite of and a precursor to pethidine (meperidine).  It is scheduled by UN Single Convention on Narcotic Drugs.  It is a Schedule II Narcotic controlled substance in the United States and has an ACSCN of 9234.  The 2014 annual manufacturing quota was 6 grams. 

Pethidinic acid is a controlled drug because of its potential uses in manufacturing both pethidine itself and some of its substituted derivatives, but it has little opioid activity in its own right. Metabolism of pethidine to pethidinic acid is carried out mainly by the carboxylesterase enzyme hCE-1 in the liver, and since the activity of this enzyme can vary between individuals, the rate and extent of pethidinic acid production can vary.

Frank Wätjen used pethidinic acid as a precursor chemical to a heterocyclic moiety.

See also
 Moramide intermediate
 Methadone intermediate
 Pethidine intermediate A
 Pethidine intermediate B (norpethidine)

References 

Synthetic opioids
4-Phenylpiperidines
Carboxylic acids
Human drug metabolites